Dhatiwang is a village in Arghakhanchi District in the Lumbini Zone of southern Nepal. At the time of the 1991 Nepal census, the village had a population of 2100 living in 391 houses. At the time of the 2001 Nepal census, the population was 2227, of which 70% was literate.

References

Populated places in Arghakhanchi District